Tricia Mayba (born ) is a Canadian female volleyball player. She is a member of the Canada women's national volleyball team and played for PTPS Piła in 2014.

She played CIS volleyball for the University of Manitoba where she won a silver medal at the 2010 CIS Women's Volleyball Championship.
She was part of the Canadian national team at the 2010 FIVB Volleyball Women's World Championship.

Clubs
 PTPS Piła

References

External links
http://olympic.ca/team-canada/tricia-mayba/
 https://www.uwinnipeg.ca/index/uw-wesmennews-action/story.315/title.women-s-volleyball-off-to-final-four
http://www.canadawest.org/sports/wvball/2010-11/releases/WVB_0727115121.html

1989 births
Living people
Canadian women's volleyball players
Manitoba Bisons volleyball players
Expatriate volleyball players in Poland
Canadian expatriate sportspeople in Poland
Middle blockers